Bedriaga's rock lizard (Archaeolacerta bedriagae) is a species of lizard in the family Lacertidae. The species is monotypic within the genus Archaeolacerta. It is only found on the islands Corsica and Sardinia. The scientific name Lacerta bedriagae is also used. There are three recognized subspecies.

Etymology
Both the common name and the specific name, bedriagae, are in honor of Russian-born herpetologist Jacques von Bedriaga.

Habitat
The natural habitats of A. bedriagae are temperate forests, temperate shrubland, Mediterranean-type shrubby vegetation, rivers, rocky areas, pastureland, and rural gardens.

Conservation status
A. bedriagae is threatened by habitat loss. This rare species is protected by CITES.

Description
Outside the mating season, adults of A. bedriagae are brownish-grey with a dark, fine-lined net pattern on their backs. The female is browner than the male, and the male in mating season acquires a blue belly, blue loins, and blue dots on the flanks. The netlike pattern seems to turn into a pattern of white dots. Juveniles are discernible by their bright azure blue tails.

Ecology
Bedriaga's rock lizard climbs vertical rocks, cliffs, walls and ruins. When frightened, it sometimes tries to escape in the water, and it is a good swimmer. Its diet consists of insects and other small invertebrates. Peculiar to this lizard, it jumps off the ground often to catch flying insects. Most other Lacertidae cannot make high jumps to catch their prey.

Subspecies
Three subspecies are recognized as being valid, including the nominotypical subspecies.
Archeolacerta bedriagae bedriagae  – Corsica
Archeolacerta bedriagae paessleri  – Sardinia
Archeolacerta bedriagae sardoa  – Sardinia

See also
List of reptiles of Italy

References

Further reading
Arnold EN, Burton JA (1978). A Field Guide to the Reptiles and Amphibians of Britain and Europe. London: Collins. 272 pp. + Plates 1-40. . (Lacerta bedriagae, p. 152 + Map 78).
Camerano L (1885). "Monografia dei Sauri italiani ". Zoologische Anzeiger 8: 417–419. (Lacerta oxycephala bedriagae, new subspecies, p. 418). (in Italian).
Lanza B, Cessaraccio G, Malenotti P (1984). "Note su Archaeolacerta bedriagae (Camerano) (Reptilia: Lacertidae)". Boll. Soc. Sarda Sci. Nat. 23: 145–153. (in Italian).
Mertens R (1921). "Zur Kenntnis der Reptilienfaunen von Malta ". Zool. Anz. 53: 236–240. (in German).
Mertens R (1927). "Herpetologische Mitteilungen. XVI. Eine neue Rasse von Lacerta bedriagae Camerano". Senckenbergiana 8 (3/4): 178–180. (Lacerta bedriagae paessleri, new subspecies). (in German).
Peracca MG (1903). "Descrizione di una nuova specie del gen. Lacerta L. di Sardegna". Bollettino dei Musei di Zoologia ed Anatomia Comparata della R[egia]. Università di Torino 18 (458): 1–3. (Lacerta sardoa, new species). (in Italian).

Lacertidae
Fauna of Sardinia
Reptiles described in 1885
Taxa named by Lorenzo Camerano
Taxonomy articles created by Polbot